František Muzika (26 June 1900 – 1 November 1974) was a Czech artist. He was a prominent representative of avant-garde in Czechoslovakia in the first half of the 20th century.

Muzika was a painter, graphic designer, stage designer, illustrator, editor and professor at the Academy of Arts, Architecture and Design in Prague.

Biography

Muzika was born in Prague. He was a member of Devětsil since 1921 and Mánes since 1923. After finishing his study at the Academy of Arts, Prague in 1924, he received a one-year scholarship from the French government for studying at École des Beaux-Arts. In Paris he also received private lessons from František Kupka at his atelier. In Paris he met Max Jacob, who took him to meet Léonce Rosenberg. On Sundays he had regular meetings with Joseph Bernard, where he also met Maillol and Bissière, with whom he exhibited at Salon d'Automne.

In 1925, after he returned from Paris, his experiences with the work of Georges Braque and Pablo Picasso led Muzika to change his style of painting.

In his final years, he suffered from cardiac disease. He died 1 November 1974 in his atelier, with his final, unfinished work, "Staircase" ("Schodiště") on the easel.

Paintings

First period (1918–1924)

At first Muzika was influenced by Bohumil Kubišta. His first paintings portrayed still lifes and architecture. He then shifted to a primitivist neoclassicism. He focused on pastoral scenes and everyday life.

Second period (1925–1936)
After Paris he radically revised his artistic poetics. Objects lost their material character. His painting style relaxed. He created a new pictorial reality that took the form of Lyrical Cubism. After 1930, Muzika involved surrealist elements in his process. The poetics of Muzika's pictures were influenced by the work of Giorgio de Chirico and Muzika's own experiences as a stage designer.

Third period (1936 – about 1948)
Muzika reacted to the Spanish Civil War, the occupation of Czechoslovakia, and the brutality of war. Muzika's wartime period shows the torment and grief of this tragic time with allegorical pictures. His paintings with imaginary landscapes, dark atmospheres, and jarring metaphors created the feeling of dramatic tension and darkness of the time.

The post–war period
"During the post-war period František Muzika developed his own original poetics that, in close accord with the trends of contemporary international art, elaborated further the original orientation of his poetical vision of the world."

Final years (1948–1974)
Muzika's topic of his paintings was the fossilized world. Muzika erased the differences between the real and unreal, the microcosm and macrocosm. His works emphasized heavy symbolism.

Other work

In 1927 Muzika started to expand to other fields, such as stage design and book illustrations. He was an editor of cultural magazines. One example of his 107-stage designs is "Julietta" by Bohuslav Martinů in the Czech National Theatre (1938). In 1927 he started his work on the book Krásné písmo (a history of Latin script), which was published in 1958 in Czechoslovakia and Schöne Schrift in 1965, in German. He also designed many posters; for example, he did a poster for Emil Filla's exhibition and for Prague Spring 1946 and 1947. His symbol from the poster is still the logo for Prague Spring International Music Festival (Pražské jaro) today.

He illustrated many books, including Karel Čapek's R.U.R.

Muzika's pupils included Daniela Havlíčková and Eliška Konopiská.

Exhibitions
Muzika's paintings and drawings are in many Czech and foreign galleries, as well as in the Centre Pompidou, Paris.
Muzika had many exhibitions in Czechoslovakia, beginning in 1922.

International group exhibits

 1948 – Biennale Venice
 1964 – Biennale Venice
 1968 – Obsessions et Visions, Gallery André François Petit, Paris
(exhibited together with Giorgio de Chirico, Max Ernst, Salvador Dalí, René Magritte)
 1969 – Surrealism in Europe, Baukunst Gallery, Cologne, Germany
 1969 – "Phases", Musee d'Ixelles, Brussels

International solo exhibits
 1965 – Galleria del Naviglio, Milan, Italy
 1965 – Galleria del Cavallino, Venice, Italy
 1967 – Galerie Maya, Brussels, Belgium
 1971 – Lambert Monet Art Gallery, Geneva, Switzerland
 1972 – Baukunst Galerie, Cologne, Germany

International stage design exhibits
 Vienna 1935
 Milano 1936
 Paris 1937
 São Paulo 1959
 Touring exhibition, South America 1960–1963

International awards
 1937 – 2 awards—exhibition in Paris (stage design)
 1939 – 2 awards VI. Triennale, Milan
 1959 – Gold Medal – books graphics, Leipzig, Germany

Czechoslovak awards 
 1939—Honor award—Society of Bibliophiles
 1949—State award for book design
 1961—Meritorious Artist (Zasloužilý umělec), for graphic work and pedagogic work
 1964—Award for book "Krásné Písmo" (Státní nakladatelství krásné literatury a umění)
 1966—Award and medal "Řád Práce" for lifetime art work and for theoretical and pedagogic work

Posters 
 Prague Spring (international music festival) 1946, 1947, 1981
Page with the logo ( or forte) from Muzika's poster adorning the Rudolfinum during the annual festival
 E. Filla exhibition 1947
 J. Wagner exhibition 1957

References

Literature 
Šmejkal, František: František Muzika. Odeon Prague, 1966 (in Czech).

External links 
František Muzika (Archive of the National Gallery Prague) 
ČRO Vltava 22.5.2012,ČRO Vltava 25.7.2012, scénograf FM v AJG Hluboká 
Centre Pompidou, Paris, France Enter "Muzika" into the search field.

1900 births
Czech male painters
Czech illustrators
Czech scenic designers
1974 deaths
20th-century Czech painters
Artists from Prague
20th-century Czech male artists
Academic staff of the Academy of Arts, Architecture and Design in Prague